Cessens is a former commune in the Savoie department in the Auvergne-Rhône-Alpes region in south-eastern France. On 1 January 2016, it was merged into the new commune of Entrelacs.

See also
Communes of the Savoie department

References

Former communes of Savoie